Angiolo Maria Colomboni (1608–1672) was an Italian monk, mathematician, and draughtsman, drawing mainly detailed flowers and birds.

He was born in Gubbio in 1608, and joined the monastic order of Olivetans. He applied himself to mathematics. In 1669, while in Bologna, he printed a mathematical text titled Practica Gnomonica. His drawings of flowers and birds, have been compared to those of Giovanni da Udine. In Bologna, he achieved the title of abbot, but returned to Gubbio to indulge his studies.

Sources

1608 births
1672 deaths
People from Gubbio
Italian draughtsmen
17th-century Italian painters
Italian male painters
Italian painters of animals
Italian mathematicians